A fraction anthem is a text spoken or sung during the Christian rite of Holy Eucharist, at the point when the celebrant breaks the consecrated bread. The term is used commonly in the Episcopal Church in the United States of America. The term is an approximate translation of confractorium, a term borrowed from the Ambrosian Rite.

The prayer book Common Worship: Services and Prayers for the Church of England published by The Archbishops’ Council in 2000 and now in wide use within the Church of England includes the following optional Fraction Anthem:

The older Alternative Service Book published in 1980 lists two fraction anthems for Rite A, the Pascha Nostrum and the Agnus Dei. For Rite B only Christ our Passover (Pascha Nostrum) is listed, although the Agnus Dei is often used as well. However, in both rites other appropriate texts may be substituted. 

The Hymnal 1982 includes a rich palette of congregational settings of fraction anthems, ranging from traditional plainchant to settings by modern composers.

Anglican liturgy
Anglican church music